Amanda is a 2018 French drama film directed by Mikhaël Hers.

Plot 
Living in Paris, 24-year-old David is close to his sister Sandrine – a single mother – and her seven-year-old daughter, Amanda. Sandrine is an English teacher, while David looks after holiday lets and is a part-time gardener. He meets Lena, a piano teacher. Sandrine goes to the park with friends where, in a terrorist attack, she is killed and Lena injured. David looks after Amanda but, even with the help of his aunt Maud, he isn’t sure he can cope and considers sending her to a children’s home. Amanda initially wants to stay with Maud but, as she and David begin to bond, she changes her mind. Lena moves back home to Bordeaux but David asks her to move in with him. He then takes Amanda to London to meet his estranged mother Alison, and to visit Wimbledon. As their relationship deepens, David decides to become Amanda’s guardian and to adopt her.

Cast

 Vincent Lacoste as David
 Stacy Martin as Léna
  as Amanda
 Ophélia Kolb as Sandrine
 Marianne Basler as Maud
 Jonathan Cohen as Axel
 Greta Scacchi as Alison
  as the children's home director
 Nabiha Akkari as Raja
 Raphaël Thiéry as Moïse
 Claire Tran as Lydia 
 Elli Medeiros as Eve
 Zoé Bruneau as the social worker
 Lily Bensliman as the journalist at the café
 Lawrence Valin as the Indian father
 Missia Piccoli as the mother at the lycée
 David Olivier Fischer as the father at the lycée
 Luke Tristan as the man beside the Thames
 Jeanne Candel as the first young woman in the hospital
 Lisa Wisznia as the second young woman in the hospital
 Léah Lapiower as Emmanuelle
 Carole Rochet as the guardian at the school
 Christopher Koderisch as a tennis player
 Lannart Zynga as a tennis player

References

External links
 

2018 films
2018 drama films
2010s French films
2010s French-language films
Films directed by Mikhaël Hers
Films scored by Anton Sanko
French drama films